Muddy Water Blues: A Tribute to Muddy Waters is the second solo album by Paul Rodgers (of Free and Bad Company fame), consisting predominantly of covers of songs made famous by blues artist Muddy Waters.

Although attributed solely to Paul Rodgers, the album features many other artists including Jeff Beck, Jason Bonham, David Gilmour, Buddy Guy, Brian May, Steve Miller, Gary Moore, Trevor Rabin, Richie Sambora, Neal Schon, Brian Setzer and Slash. As well as the standard one-disc edition, a limited edition version was also produced featuring a bonus disc of re-recordings of Free and Bad Company hits.

Track listing

Personnel

 Paul Rodgers - vocals, guitar
Jason Bonham - drums
Pino Palladino - bass guitar, fretless bass guitar
Ian Hatton - guitar
Buddy Guy - guitar
Trevor Rabin - guitar
Brian Setzer - guitar
Jeff Beck - guitar
Steve Miller - guitar
Jimi Haun - guitar
Ronnie Foster - Hammond organ
Jimmie Wood - harmonica
David Gilmour - guitar
Slash - guitar
Gary Moore - guitar
Brian May - guitar
Neal Schon - guitar
David Paich - piano, Hammond organ
Richie Sambora - guitar
Billy Sherwood - percussion

References

Paul Rodgers albums
1993 albums